Demon's Run is a 1981 board game published by Yaquinto Publications.

Gameplay
Demon's Run is an interstellar racing game taking place in an area of space where the hazards include black holes, radiation zones, and unusual "null" areas.

Reception
Earl Perkins reviewed Demon's Run in The Space Gamer No. 54. Perkins commented that "However, Demon's Run is an excellent game.  The idea is novel; the execution of the idea makes and enjoyable game, more so for three or more players than for one."

References

Board games introduced in 1981
Yaquinto Publications games